, also known as  and the  who is closed mouthed.  These two are said to be analogous to the two Niō or guardian gate statues, who respectively form the open and closed A-un shapes in their mouths. Rikishi and Konron masks are often mixed up due to their similar features, they possess a darker complexion, bulging eyes, large mouths and jutting teeth. These masks can be differentiated through their facial expressions as the Konron is less aggressive than Rikishi.   

With the exaggerated features of many of the masks, the content of the play is described as being farcical.

In the ribald performance, the lascivious Kuron falls in lust for the Gojo (Wu woman or Chinese maiden), and expresses his desire by holding up his phallic prop called , and beating it with his hand fan. In subsequent development, the Kuron is subdued by the Rikishi who binds the Kuron by his equipment (marakata), and drags him along by the noose around his manhood.

Masks

  "Govern the way" - Leads the procession part. This mask has been suggested as precursor of the depiction of Tengu masks TNM (ex-Horyuji) quarter view It was a red headed mask with a wide mouth, long nose, wide bulging eyes, dark brows and sometimes contained few whiskers on the chin.
  "lion" - Lion mask with movable jaw, ear, eyes, similar in appearance to the mask from Shishimai lion dance. The mask contained tiny ears applied to a large circular face, a red tongue and snout, white teeth, brown, red, or green.
  "lion tamers" - Usually two tamers accompany each lion TNM (ex-Horyuji)  (ex-Horyuji) and another tamer, TNM (ex-Horyuji)
  "Duke of Wu" - TCM (ex-Horyuji)
  "Vajra-yakṣa)" - Topknotted wrestler, wide-eyed and flexed eyebrows, open-mouthed. Serves Lord of Wu. ex-Horyuji, Cultural Heritage Online
  "Garuḍa" - TNM (ex-Horyuji)
  "Kunlun (black man)" - TNM
  "Wu woman" or "Chinese maiden" - TNM (8th century)
  "wrestler" or "Strong Man" - Topknotted wrestler like Kongo, but closed-mouthed.  TNM (ex-Horyuji)
  "Brāhmaṇa" priests -TNM (ex-Horyuji)
  "old widower" - TNM
  "old widower's child" - TNM
  "drunken Persian king" or  "Drunken Hu barbarian" - TNM
  "drunken Persian's followers" -  about 6~8 of them accompany the drunken Persian king. TNM

Influence 

Many of these masks also influenced other Japanese theatre forms, Noh, for example particularly has masks very similar to the gigaku masks of goko and gojo. The well resemblance of  gojo can be seen in the well known Noh mask of Koomote as well as Chido and Konron to the ghost and demon masks with their stark, exaggerated, and frightening features. Though these masks share similarities it is important to note that there are also differences with them, for example the masks of Noh are much smaller in comparison to gigaku, this is also the case with bugaku (the emerging theatre form after gigaku).

See also
 Gagaku - 
 Karura
 Kunlun Mountain (mythology)
 
 
 Theatre in Japan
 Menreiki

References

 
  (world encyclopedia, in Japanese)
 , p. 85
 , p. 36ff, illustrated.

External links
 Tokyo National Museum (TNM) image search
 Cultural Heritage Online

Japanese styles of music
Classical and art music traditions
Japanese traditional music
Masked dances
Masquerade ceremonies in Asia
Japanese words and phrases